This was the first edition of the tournament.

Conchita Martínez won the title, defeating Barbara Paulus in the final 6–1, 4–6, 6–4.

Seeds
A champion seed is indicated in bold text while text in italics indicates the round in which that seed was eliminated. The top two seeds received a bye to the second round.

  Conchita Martínez (champion)
  Barbara Paulus (final)
  Amanda Coetzer (first round)
  Sabine Appelmans (semifinals)
  Ruxandra Dragomir (quarterfinals)
  Silvia Farina (first round)
  Barbara Schett (semifinals)
  Katarína Studeníková (quarterfinals)

Draw

Final

Section 1

Section 2

External links
 1996 Kremlin Cup draw

Kremlin Cup
Kremlin Cup